Chaturbhuj Temple (Devanagari: चतुर्भुज मंदिर) is a Hindu temple dedicated to the god Vishnu in Khajuraho, India. This temple is also known as Jatakari Temple (Devanagari: जटकारी) as it is situated in the village of Jatakari.

The name Chaturbhuja (lit. "One who has four arms") is an epithet of Vishnu. The temple was built  by Yasovarman of the Chandela Dynasty in c. 1100 CE. This is the only temple in Khajuraho which lacks erotic sculptures.

Location
This temple is located near a village Jatakara at Khajuraho. This temple is also known as Jatakari Temple on the name of the village.

It is grouped under southern group of temples, due to is location in southern area of Khajuraho.

Architecture
The temple consists of a sanctum without ambulatory, vestibule, mandapa and an entrance porch. The temple stands on a Modest (chabutara).

Around the wall, there are three bands of sculptures (see also image of outer wall).

Main idol
The main idol in the temple is of four-armed Lord Vishnu (also seen in the image). It is 2.7 meters in height. This idol is south faced as the favorite location of Vishnu, same south facing plan is incorporated in Angkor Wat Temple in Cambodia.

Gallery

References

External links
 M.P. Tourism Website, Official Website of Madhya Pradesh State Tourism Corporation, Khajuraho
 Archaeological Survey of India, Bhopal Division, Index Page for Khajuraho - Chhatarpur 
 Archaeological Survey of India, Bhopal Division, Chaturbhuj Temple, Khajuraho

Bundelkhand
Monuments and memorials in Madhya Pradesh
World Heritage Sites in Madhya Pradesh
Hindu temples in Khajuraho
Vishnu temples